Automotive Skills Limited is an English registered charity and one of 25 Sector Skills Councils (SSC), responsible for the retail motor industry, awarded a licensed by the then secretary of state at the Department for Education and Skills, the Rt Hon Charles Clarke MP, in February 2004.

History
The SSC suffered a fraud at the hands of its finance manager, which was discovered in 2006 . Subsequently, Automotive Skills' SSC license was transferred to the Institute of the Motor Industry in September 2007 .  The Institute uses the Automotive Skills brand, although the separate charity still exists .

The SSC had a contract with the Sector Skills Development Agency (SSDA), which was replaced by the UK Commission for Employment and Skills (UKCES) on 1 April 2008.  One role of the UKCES will be to manage the performance of the Sector Skills Councils, advising Ministers on their re-licensing .

The members of Automotive Skills Limited appointed liquidators PJ Clark and PD Williams of corporate restructuring organisation MCR, on 24 July 2008 .

Structure
It was headquartered in Brickendon in Hertfordshire.

References

External links 
 

Automotive industry in the United Kingdom
Career and technical education
East Hertfordshire District
Education in Hertfordshire
Motor trade associations
Sector Skills Councils